was a Japanese freestyle swimmer who competed in the 1932 Summer Olympics and in the 1936 Summer Olympics. He was born in Kagoshima Prefecture. In 1932 he was eliminated in the semi-finals of the 1500 metre freestyle event. Four years later he finished fourth in the 1500 metre freestyle competition.

External links
Sunao Ishiharada's profile at Sports Reference.com
Mention of Sunao Ishiharada's death 

1915 births
1987 deaths
Olympic swimmers of Japan
Swimmers at the 1932 Summer Olympics
Swimmers at the 1936 Summer Olympics
World record setters in swimming
Japanese male freestyle swimmers
20th-century Japanese people